The Self-Transcendence 3100 mile race is the world's longest certified footrace. In 1996 Sri Chinmoy created this event as a 2,700-mile (4,345 km) race. At the award ceremony that year he declared that the 1997 edition would be extended to 3,100 miles (4,989 km).

This multi-day race, which lasts several weeks, is hosted by the Sri Chinmoy Marathon Team and takes place in Queens, New York in the United States from June–August every year. The course is 3,100 miles (4,989 km) long. Runners negotiate 5,649 laps of one extended city block in Jamaica, Queens - 164th Place to Abigail Adams (84th) Avenue to 168th Street to Grand Central Parkway
—a distance of 0.5488 miles (883 m), while the streets are in normal use. The runners have 52 days in which to complete the distance, running from 6 a.m. to midnight, an average of 59.62 miles (95.95 km) every day. The prize is typically a T-shirt, a DVD, or a small trophy.

History 
The Self-Transcendence 3100 mile was founded by Sri Chinmoy out of his wish to create an opportunity for runners to discover the limits of their capacities and to try to go beyond them. Hence, the name "Self-Transcendence", which is appended to all the footraces that the Sri Chinmoy Marathon Team hosts. Since 1985 when the group first began holding races, the focus on the ultramarathon and multiday races has grown from the Ultra Trio, three races with staggered starts of 700, 1000 and 1300-mile duration that take place in September, and the spring races, which include the Self-Transcendence 6-Day race and the only annual race of its kind, the Self-Transcendence 10-Day race.

In 1996 Sri Chinmoy created this event as a 2,700-mile (4,345 km) race. At the award ceremony that year he declared that the 1997 edition would be extended to 3,100 miles (4,989 km). The race has been run at this distance every year since.

In 2020, it was held in Salzburg, Austria due to the COVID-19 pandemic from September 13 to November 3.

In 2021, the COVID-19 pandemic continues, causing the typical start date for the race, mid-June instead he was first started on Sunday, September 5, 2021.

The list of runners for 2022 has been established.  The race for 2022 started on Sunday, September 4.

Race
The race distance is the distance from the west to the east coast of the US, plus 11 marathons. After the race director (Sahishnu Szczesiul): In the early years there were drug dealers in the area and lawlessness—people did not want to leave their cars, which would have been stripped—but this was later much improved. For their safety, only runners with proven ultra-running experience may compete. The race is run daily, changing direction each day, whatever the weather, which has ranged from  heat to torrential downpour—runners sometimes carry umbrellas. Competitors run among people going about their everyday lives, dodging pedestrians and cyclists, and occasionally large crowds for various events or celebrations.

Sri Chinmoy said that the Self-Transcendence challenges runners to "transcend their own previous capacity", "gain spiritual insights" and "overcome the entire world's pre-conceived notions of possibility". Runners have spoken of "the most overwhelming moment", "When you run a marathon, you feel good ... when you run 3,100 miles, you feel even better still".

Vegetarian meals are provided by volunteers from an improvised kitchen; runners need to eat constantly, burning 10,000 kcal a day. Runners have six hours a day for eating, washing, foot care and sleep.

The race can be followed on the race website; regular updates for the participants are published there, and a webcam has been operating during recent years. An album of photo images is also published, several days a week, to record race activity.

Records and winners

Records 
The world record is held by Ashprihanal Aalto who finished with a time of 40 days 09:06:21 in July 2015, breaking the previous record of 41 days 08:16:29 held by Madhupran Wolfgang Schwerk. The ladies' record is held by Kaneenika Janakova who completed 3100 miles in 48 days 14:24:10 in 2017. She broke the 49 days 07:52:24 record set by Surasa Mairer in 2015. Suprabha Beckjord is the only person to have completed every edition of the race (until 2009). Ashprihanal Aalto has won the race nine times and participated 15 times.

List of winners

See also
 Self-Transcendence 6- & 10-day Race

References 
{{reflist|refs=

<ref name="sc-wp">srichinmoy.wordpress.com {{cite web|url=https://srichinmoy.wordpress.com/2017/08/04/vasu-finished-3100-mile-race-in-ny/ |title= Vasu finished 3100 mile race in NY|date= 4 August 2017|access-date=2017-08-06}}</ref>

}}

 Further reading 

Literature
 Cunningham, Grahak : Running Beyond The Marathon - insights into the longest footrace in the world, eText Press Publishing, 2012, ASIN B00AK1J0WS
 Emmaus, PA: Endurancs Special - An ultramarathon is one thing. But 3,100 miles around a city block is something else entirely. What does it take to endure the world's longest (and strangest) race?, Runner's World, Zürich 2007, OCLC 103305923
 Hoad, Richard : World's Toughest Endurance Challenges, Bloomsbury Publishing, 2012, 

Film
 Rawal,Sanjay : 3100: Run and Become'', Eng. 2018, IMDb 4936398, 79 minutes

External links 

 
 Video: Report, WSJ
 Video: Report AFP (Eng.)

Runner 
grahakcunningham.com
lebedev.org.ua
yolandaholder.com
williamsichel.co.uk
Ultrabeh.sk

Annual events in New York City
Multiday races
Ultramarathons in the United States
Recurring sporting events established in 1986
1986 establishments in New York City
Road running competitions in the United States
Sports competitions in New York City
Sports events founded by Sri Chinmoy
Annual sporting events in the United States
June sporting events
Sports in Queens, New York